Moondru Pengal is a 1956 Indian Tamil-language film directed by R. S. Prakash. The film stars R. S. Manohar and Girija.

Cast
List adapted from the database of Film News Anandan

Male cast
R. S. Manohar
T. S. Balaiah
S. A. Asokan
T. S. Durairaj
Female cast
Girija
P. K. Saraswathi
M. N. Rajam

Production
The film was produced under the banner JayaSri Lakshmi Pictures and directed by R. S. Prakash. P. X. Rangasami wrote the screenplay and dialogues. Cinematography was done by Veerabahu while the editing was done by N. V. Javeri. Ammaiyappan was the art director while P. S. Gopalakrishnan was in charge of choreography. Still photography was done by R. N. Nagaraja Rao.

Soundtrack
Music was composed by K. V. Mahadevan while the lyrics were penned by Kambadasan, M. P. Sivan, Thanjai N. Ramaiah Dass and Udumalai Narayana Kavi. Playback singers are Jikki, T. V. Rathnam, R. Balasaraswathi, A. P. Komala, A. G. Rathnamala, P. Leela, Udutha Sarojini, T. A. Mothi and Sirkazhi Govindarajan

References

External links

Indian black-and-white films
Films scored by K. V. Mahadevan
1950s Tamil-language films
Films directed by R. S. Prakash
Films scored by Ashwatthama